Anoka is an unincorporated community in Washington Township, Cass County, Indiana.

History
A post office was established at Anoka in 1856, and remained in operation until it was discontinued in 1903. One source speculates the name Anoka might be of Sioux origin.

Geography

References

Unincorporated communities in Cass County, Indiana
Unincorporated communities in Indiana